Montagne de Bueren is a 374-step staircase in Liège, Belgium. The staircase is named after Vincent de Bueren, who defended Liège against an attack by the Duke of Burgundy, Charles the Bold in the 15th century. It was built in 1881 to honour the 600 soldiers who died in the battle.

In 2013, Montagne de Bueren was ranked as #1 on The Huffington Post's list of Most Extreme Staircases.

In July 2020, in response to the impact of the COVID-19 pandemic in Belgium, Belgian explorer and adventurer Louis-Philippe Loncke ascended and descended the staircase 135 times carrying a 15 kg backpack, simulating an ascent of Mount Everest. The 9000m climb, which took 65 hours 30 minutes, was meant to show that one could still "trouver des défis physiques près de chez soi" (find physical challenges close to home).

References

External links 
 

Buildings and structures in Liège
Geography of Liège
Tourist attractions in Liège
Stairways